Benyvirus is a genus of viruses, in the family Benyviridae. Plant serve as natural hosts. There are four species in this genus. Diseases associated with this genus include: BNYVV: rhizomania.

Taxonomy
 Beet necrotic yellow vein virus       (ICTVdB Virus Code: 00.088.0.01.001)
 Beet soil-borne mosaic virus        (ICTVdB Virus Code: 00.088.0.01.002)
 Burdock mottle virus (ICTVdB Virus Code: 00.088.0.01.004)
 Rice stripe necrosis virus, isolates of which are known as RSNV, (ICTVdB Virus Code: 00.088.0.01.003), a rod-shaped virus containing just six open reading frames in its genome. A pathogen of rice plants, it may cause chlorosis, necrosis, and malformation.

Structure

Viruses in the genus Benyvirus are non-enveloped, with rod-shaped geometries. The diameter is around 20 nm, with a length of 85–390 nm. Genomes are linear and segmented, around 6.7kb in length.

Life cycle
Viral replication is cytoplasmic. Entry into the host cell is achieved by penetration into the host cell. Replication follows the positive stranded RNA virus replication model. Positive stranded RNA virus transcription is the method of transcription. The virus exits the host cell by tripartite non-tubule guided viral movement.
Plant serve as the natural host. The virus is transmitted via a vector (protozoan). Transmission routes are vector.

References

External links
 ICTV Online Report; Benyviridae
 Viralzone: Benyvirus

Benyviruses
Viral plant pathogens and diseases
Riboviria
Virus genera